Peter 'Drago' Sell, (born August 5, 1982) is an American mixed martial artist who most recently competed in the Welterweight division. A professional competitor since 2002, he has formerly competed for the UFC, and was a competitor on The Ultimate Fighter: The Comeback.

Career

Ultimate Fighting Championship
Sell made his debut with the UFC at UFC 51, defeating Top contender Phil Baroni by guillotine choke submission in what was considered a major upset, considering he was a 5–1 underdog.

After a controversial Technical knockout stoppage in his first fight against The Ultimate Fighter veteran Nate Quarry at UFC Ultimate Fight Night, Sell was then seen as a middleweight contestant on The Ultimate Fighter: The Comeback, which premiered on August 17, 2006. He entered the competition alongside Matt Serra, who competed one weight class below Sell in the welterweight division. Sell defeated "Chainsaw" Charles McCarthy to move on the semi-finals of the competition, where he lost to the ultimate winner of the tournament Travis Lutter. Although Sell did not proceed the finals, he was featured on the undercard of the season finale where he lost to Scott Smith in a back and forth war that ended via sudden highlight reel knockout.

He then fought and lost to Thales Leites at UFC 69. He lost the fight via unanimous decision.

His next fight was a rematch against Nathan Quarry, at UFC Fight Night 11. Sell lost to Quarry once again via KO in the third round.

Sell made his second appearance on The Ultimate Fighter as a trainer for Team Serra for season 6, The Ultimate Fighter: Team Hughes vs. Team Serra.

Sell has dropped down to welterweight for his latest matches; a victory over Josh Burkman at UFC 90, and a knockout loss to Matt Brown at UFC 96.

His match against Brown was somewhat controversial, as referee Yves Lavigne pulled Matt Brown off of a stunned Pete Sell early in the bout, but quickly after ordered both men to resume fighting.  After the event, Sell was still visibly dazed, and was unable to mount any offense, or competently defend himself.  Eventually Brown knocked Sell out with a series of punches 1:32 into the first round.

Post-UFC career
After a two-year hiatus from MMA, Sell finally made his return and defeated Elijah Harshbarger via armbar in the second round at Ring of Combat XXXVI.

Sell then faced Nordine Taleb at Ring of Combat 38 on November 18, 2011. Sell lost the bout via technical knockout in the second round.

Sell would then win his next fight via unanimous decision against Mitch Whitesel at Ring of Combat 39 on February 10, 2012.

Sell was expected to face Elijah Harshbarger for a second time at Ring of Combat 49 on September 19, 2014. However, the bout was cancelled for unknown reasons. The bout was rescheduled to September 25, 2015, which Sell lost by unanimous decision.

Championships and accomplishments
Ring of Combat
ROC Middleweight Championship (One time)
Ultimate Fighting Championship
Fight of the Night (One time) vs. Scott Smith

Mixed martial arts record

|-
| Loss
| align=center| 10–7
| Elijah Harshbarger
| Decision (unanimous)
| Ring of Combat 52
| 
| align=center| 3
| align=center| 5:00
| Atlantic City, New Jersey, United States
|For Ring of Combat Welterweight Championship.
|-
| Win 
| align=center| 10–6
| Mitch Whitesel 
| Decision (unanimous)
| Ring of Combat 39 
| 
| align=center| 3
| align=center| 5:00
| Atlantic City, New Jersey, United States
|Catchweight (180 lbs) bout.
|-
| Loss
| align=center| 9–6
| Nordine Taleb
| TKO (punches)
| Ring of Combat 38
| 
| align=center| 2
| align=center| 0:53
| Atlantic City, New Jersey, United States
|Lost Ring of Combat Welterweight Championship.
|-
| Win
| align=center| 9–5
| Elijah Harshbarger
| Submission (armbar)
| Ring of Combat 36
| 
| align=center| 2
| align=center| 3:24
| Atlantic City, New Jersey, United States
|Won Ring of Combat Welterweight Championship.
|-
| Loss
| align=center| 8–5
| Matt Brown
| TKO (punches)
| UFC 96
| 
| align=center| 1
| align=center| 1:32
| Columbus, Ohio, United States
| 
|-
| Win
| align=center| 8–4
| Josh Burkman
| Decision (unanimous)
| UFC 90
| 
| align=center| 3
| align=center| 5:00
| Rosemont, Illinois, United States
| 
|-
| Loss
| align=center| 7–4
| Nate Quarry
| KO (punch)
| UFC Fight Night: Thomas vs. Florian
| 
| align=center| 3
| align=center| 0:44
| Las Vegas, Nevada, United States
| 
|-
| Loss
| align=center| 7–3
| Thales Leites
| Decision (unanimous)
| UFC 69
| 
| align=center| 3
| align=center| 5:00
| Houston, Texas, United States
| 
|-
| Loss
| align=center| 7–2
| Scott Smith
| KO (punch)
| The Ultimate Fighter: The Comeback Finale
| 
| align=center| 2
| align=center| 3:25
| Las Vegas, Nevada, United States
| 
|-
| Win
| align=center| 7–1
| Landon Showalter
| Decision (unanimous)
| Ring of Combat 10
| 
| align=center| 3
| align=center| 5:00
| Atlantic City, New Jersey, United States
| 
|-
| Loss
| align=center| 6–1
| Nate Quarry
| TKO (punch)
| UFC Ultimate Fight Night
| 
| align=center| 1
| align=center| 0:42
| Las Vegas, Nevada, United States
| 
|-
| Win
| align=center| 6–0
| Phil Baroni
| Submission (guillotine choke)
| UFC 51
| 
| align=center| 3
| align=center| 4:19
| Las Vegas, Nevada, United States
| 
|-
| Win
| align=center| 5–0
| Chris Liguori
| Submission (rear-naked choke)
| Ring of Combat 6
| 
| align=center| 3
| align=center| 0:41
| Elizabeth, New Jersey, United States
| 
|-
| Win
| align=center| 4–0
| Chris Liguori
| Decision (split)
| Ring of Combat 4
| 
| align=center| 3
| align=center| 5:00
| Atlantic City, New Jersey, United States
| 
|-
| Win
| align=center| 3–0
| Derek Johnson
| Submission (armbar)
| Ring of Combat 3
| 
| align=center| 1
| align=center| 2:03
| Morristown, New Jersey, United States
| 
|-
| Win
| align=center| 2–0
| Ted Govola
| Decision (unanimous)
| Ring of Combat 2
| 
| align=center| 1
| align=center| 10:00
| Secaucus, New Jersey, United States
| 
|-
| Win
| align=center| 1–0
| Rob Biegley
| Decision
| Vengeance at the Vanderbilt 14
| 
| align=center| 1
| align=center| 10:00
| Plainview, New York, United States
|

References

External links

 

American male mixed martial artists
Mixed martial artists utilizing Brazilian jiu-jitsu
Living people
American practitioners of Brazilian jiu-jitsu
People awarded a black belt in Brazilian jiu-jitsu
1982 births
People from West Islip, New York
People from East Meadow, New York
People from Westbury, New York
Mixed martial artists from New York (state)
Ultimate Fighting Championship male fighters